Çeyildağ (also, Cheyildagh, Chair-Dagh, Cheil’dagh, and Chel’Dagh) is a settlement and municipality in Baku, Azerbaijan.  It has a population of 895.

References 

Populated places in Baku